Teodor Jeske-Choiński (27 February 1854 – 14 April 1920) was a Polish intellectual, writer and historian, literature critic.

He was a friend as well as an opponent of Henryk Sienkiewicz. Sienkiewicz' novels were focused rather on Polish history, whereas Jeske-Choińskis were looking at broader, European context. In 1900 he published Tiara i korona, a novel about the dispute between the Emperor Henry IV and Pope Gregory VII.

Michlic named him "one of the leading theorists and exponents of Anti-Semitism in Poland". In 1951, the communist censorship put complete ban on all his books, which made him completely forgotten among Polish public.

References

Polish male writers
20th-century Polish historians
Polish male non-fiction writers
1854 births
1920 deaths

Polish positivists
19th-century Polish historians
Polish conservatives